The 1961 SMU Mustangs football team represented Southern Methodist University (SMU) as a member of the Southwest Conference (SWC) during the 1961 NCAA University Division football season. Led by Bill Meek in his fifth and final season as head coach, the Mustangs compiled an overall record of 2–7–1 with a conference mark of 1–5–1, placing last out of eight teams in the SWC.

Schedule

Roster

References

SMU
SMU Mustangs football seasons
SMU Mustangs football